Christian Haeusle (born 1960) is an Austrian para-alpine skier. He represented Austria at the 1984 Winter Paralympics.

He won the silver medal at the Men's Downhill LW2 event.

He also competed at the Men's Giant Slalom LW2 and Men's Slalom LW2 events but did not win a medal.

Private life 
Haeusle lost a leg at the age of 13 in an accident involving a truck. Haeusle is an enthusiastic motorcyclist and he has taken part in motorcycle races.

See also 
 List of Paralympic medalists in alpine skiing

References 

Living people
1960 births
Place of birth missing (living people)
Paralympic alpine skiers of Austria
Alpine skiers at the 1984 Winter Paralympics
Medalists at the 1984 Winter Paralympics
Paralympic silver medalists for Austria
Paralympic medalists in alpine skiing
20th-century Austrian people